Porphyrostachys is a genus of flowering plants from the orchid family, Orchidaceae, native to South America. As of June 2014, it contains two known species:

Porphyrostachys parviflora (C.Schweinf.) Garay - Peru
Porphyrostachys pilifera (Kunth) Rchb.f. - Peru, Ecuador

References 

 Berg Pana, H. 2005. Handbuch der Orchideen-Namen. Dictionary of Orchid Names. Dizionario dei nomi delle orchidee. Ulmer, Stuttgart

External links 

Wildscreen Arkive, Porphyrostachys (Porphyrostachys pilifera)
Swiss Orchid Foundation at Herbariuim Jany Renz, Porphyrostachys pilifera (Kunth) Rchb. f.
Calphotos, University of California @ Berkeley, Porphyrostachys pilifera; Porphyrostachys Orchid 

Cranichideae genera
Orchids of South America
Cranichidinae